Nicholas Maddox (November 9, 1886 – November 27, 1954) was an American professional baseball player. He played in Major League Baseball as a right-handed pitcher for the Pittsburgh Pirates from 1907 through 1910. Maddox is one of the few pitchers to throw a no-hitter in his rookie season.

Maddox was born in Govanstown, Maryland. He defeated the Brooklyn Superbas 2–1 at Pittsburgh's Exposition Park on September 20, one week after pitching a 4–0 shutout against the St. Louis Cardinals in his major league debut.

The Pirates' home stadium in between, Forbes Field, had not witnessed a no-hitter in its 61-year (mid-–mid-) history. Through 2013, Maddox is still the youngest pitcher to throw a no-hitter in the majors.

Maddox was also the last Pirate to win his first 4 career starts (in 1907) until the feat was matched by Gerrit Cole in 2013. William F. Kirk of the New York American in 1908 called Maddox a "a well formed youth with a face like a dried apple."
After his rookie season, Maddox spent two more years with the Pirates as a starting pitcher and finished his career in 1910 as a relief pitcher. In his career, he had 43 wins, 20 losses, and a 2.29 earned run average.

Maddox died on November 27, 1954, at the age of 68 in Pittsburgh, Pennsylvania.

See also
 List of Major League Baseball no-hitters

References

External links

Major League Baseball pitchers
Baseball players from Baltimore
Pittsburgh Pirates players
Wheeling Stogies players
Kansas City Blues (baseball) players
Louisville Colonels (minor league) players
Wichita Witches players
1886 births
1954 deaths